Grigor Magistros ("Gregory the magistros"; ca. 990–1058) was an Armenian prince, linguist, scholar and public functionary. A layman of the princely Pahlavuni family that claimed descent from the dynasty established by St. Gregory the Illuminator, he was the son of the military commander Vasak Pahlavuni. After the Byzantine Empire annexed the Kingdom of Ani, Gregory went on to serve as the governor (doux) of the province of Edessa. During his tenure he worked actively to suppress the Tondrakians, a breakaway Christian Armenian sect that the Armenian and Byzantine Churches both labeled heretics. He studied both ecclesiastical and secular literature, Syriac as well as Greek. He collected all Armenian manuscripts of scientific or philosophical value that were to be found, including the works of Anania Shirakatsi, and translations from Callimachus,  Andronicus of Rhodes and Olympiodorus. He translated several works of Plato — The Laws, the Eulogy of Socrates, Euthyphro, Timaeus and Phaedo. Many ecclesiastics of the period were his pupils.

Foremost among his writings are the "Letters," which are 80 in number, and which provide information about the political and religious problems of the time. His poetry bears the impress of both Homeric Greek and the Arabic of his own century. His chief poetical work is a long metrical narrative of the principal events recorded in the Bible. This work was purportedly written in three days in 1045 at the request of a Muslim scholar, who, after reading it, converted to Christianity. Grigor was almost the first poet to adopt the use of rhyme introduced to Armenia by the Arabs.

Grigor II Vkayaser, a son of Grigor Magistros, was the Catholicos of the Armenian Apostolic Church between 1066 and 1105. Like his father, he was also a scholar and author; his name Vkayaser ("Lover of martyrs") refers to his work compiling and editing the lives of Armenian martyrs.

Works
 Գրիգոր Մագիստրոսի թղթերը [The letters of Grigor Magistros]. Alexandropol: Georg Sanoeants' Publishing, 1910. An English translation, with commentary, by Professor Theo van Lint at Oxford, is currently underway.

Studies
Muradyan, Gohar, "Greek Authors and Subject Matters in the Letters of Grigor Magistros," Revue des Études Arméniennes 35 (2013): pp. 29–77.

Notes

11th-century Armenian writers
990s births
1058 deaths
Byzantine people of Armenian descent
11th-century Byzantine writers
Byzantine governors
Magistroi
Grigor
Armenian male writers